Skorzęcin-Nadleśnictwo  is a settlement in the administrative district of Gmina Witkowo, within Gniezno County, Greater Poland Voivodeship, in west-central Poland.

It includes the buildings of the former Skorzęcin forest inspectorate, existing in the years 1821–1975.

References

Villages in Gniezno County